Kalanchoe thyrsiflora (also known as paddle plant, flapjacks, desert cabbage, white lady, geelplakkie, meelplakkie, or plakkie ) is a species of flowering plant native to Botswana, Lesotho, South Africa and Eswatini.

Taxonomy
The name Kalanchoe thyrsiflora was first validly published for this southern African species by William Henry Harvey in 1862. Based on an error introduced in The Plant List in 2012, the name K. thyrsiflora has been treated by some as a synonym of K. tetraphylla. However, these two names apply to two distinct species. The name K. tetraphylla dates from 1923 and applies to a different species confined to Madagascar.

Description
It is a succulent plant producing a stalk about 1m tall, which dies back after flowering. It forms a basal rosette of large, rounded, fleshy, stalkless leaves, which are grayish-green with red margins, covered with a white powdery bloom. The inflorescence is terminal and erect with densely clustered thyrse-like panicles of greenish waxy flowers with yellow recurved lobes, narrowly urn-shaped. The plant flowers from autumn to spring, and is common in grassveld amongst rocks.

Gallery

References

External links

PlantZAfrica.com

Flora of South Africa
tetraphylla
Plants described in 1862